Sāmāyika is the vow of periodic concentration observed by the Jains. It is one of the essential duties prescribed for both the Śrāvaka (householders) and ascetics. The preposition sam means one state of being. To become one is samaya. That, which has oneness as its object, is sāmāyikam. Sāmāyika is aimed at developing equanimity and to refrain from injury.

On the third pratimā (stage) the householder resolves to observe the sāmāyika vow three times a day.

According to the Jain text, Purushartha Siddhyupaya: 

Sāmāyika is also one of the five kinds of conduct (cāritra) other kinds being reinitiation, purity of non-injury, slight passion and perfect conduct. It is of two kinds — with and without time limit.

Duration 

The sāmāyika is performed for an antara-muhurta (about 48 minutes) every day. Champat Rai Jain in his book The Key of Knowledge writes:

Procedure 
In performing sāmāyika, the śrāvaka has to stand facing north or east and bow to the Pañca-Parameṣṭhi. He then sit down and recites the Namokara mantra a certain number of times, and finally devotes himself to holy meditation. This consists in:
pratikramana, recounting the sins committed and repenting for them, 
pratyākhyanā, resolving to avoid particular sins in future, 
sāmāyika karma, renunciation of personal attachments, and the cultivation of a feeling of regarding every body and thing alike, 
stuti, praising the four and twenty Tīrthankaras, 
vandanā, devotion to a particular Tirthankara, and 
kāyotsarga, withdrawal of attention from the body (physical personality) and becoming absorbed in the contemplation of the spiritual Self.

According to Jain text, Puruşārthasiddhyupāya: For the sake of strengthening the performance of daily meditation (sāmāyika), one must undertake fasting twice each lunar fortnight (proşadhopavāsa).

Posture 

The posture for sāmāyika may be either —
 padma āsana, the sitting posture, with inter-locked legs (the right one placed on the left thigh and the left on the right), the hands placed in the lap with the palms facing upwards (the right one being on the top), and with attention fixed on the foremost point of the nose;
 khadga āsana, the standing posture, with feet at a distance of about two inches from each other, the hands resting naturally by the sides, but not so as to touch the body; and attention fixed on the point of the nose as in the padma āsana; or
 ardha padma āsana or the semi-padma posture, which differs from the padma in respect of the position of the left leg, which is placed under the right thigh.

Great vows 

The householders, due to the absence of all sinful activities during the period of meditation (sāmāyika), observe great vows, although the conduct-deluding karmas remain in operation. According to Achārya Pujyapada's Sarvārthasiddhi:

Transgressions 
Jain texts list down five transgressions of the vow of sāmāyika. These are- Misdirected activity of the speech, mind, and body, lack of earnestness, and absent mindedness.

In performing the samayika meditation the following points are prescribed for the monk:

she should not perform it disrespectfully,
nor filled with pride of learning,
nor to be considered pious by her fellow-women, 
nor in a manner to cause disturbance to any other living being, 
she should not move the body about at the time, 
nor force it into a crooked position, e.g. bending the fingers.
not contract or gather together the bodily limbs,
not raise herself up and down like a fish on the top of a wave;
she should rid her mind of all cruel thoughts; 
she should not encircle her knees with her hands;
she should not become engaged in its performance imbued with fear, 
or with disgust, or without understanding its aim, 
or filled with conceit at her supernatural acquisitions (if any), 
nor with pride of birth; 
she should not take to it (samayika) sneakingly, that is as a thief, i.e., behind the back of the (preceptor), 
nor neglect its proper time, 
she should not allow the mind to be filled with unholy thoughts of hatred and the like for others; 
she should not excite fear in any one’s heart, 
not talk to any one at the time, 
nor think evil of any one, 
nor suffer herself to frown, 
nor entertain ungenerous sentiments in her heart, 
nor allow her gaze to wander about in different directions,
nor sit down without carefully inspecting the ground, to avoid causing injury to insect life, 
nor lose interest in the middle of the process. 
nor should she neglect it altogether for the want of any of the necessary accessories, 
she shouldn't allow her heart to be assailed by desire for sense-gratification, 
nor omit to recite the whole of the recitation, nor get up in the middle (that is, before the end of the text appointed for the purpose), 
nor blur over her words, nor hurry over some parts and linger unnecessarily over others; 
nor mumble, like a dumb person, nor make faces or signs,
nor vociferate in a croaky voice, like a frog; and, 
she should not allow her mind to play the truant at the time, that is, to run after the good things of the world.

References

Citations

Sources 
 
 
 
 

Jain practices